Hercoceras is a genus of trochoidally coiled nautiloid cephalopods placed in the nautilid family Rutoceratidae. These cephalopod lived i in the Eifelian age of the middle Devonian Period, which occurred 398-391 million years ago. Their shells have prominent lateral outgrowths in the form of spines and a high intraspecific variability.

Systematic
The Paleobiology database places Hercoceras in the family Rutoceratidae in the order Nautilida, but according to some authors it should  not be considered an early nautilid. They place this genus in the family Hercoceratidae in the superfamily Rutoceratoidea in the order Oncocerida.

Species
 Hercoceras mirum Barrande
 Hercoceras transiens Barrande

References

The Paleobiology Database
Sepkoski, Jack  Sepkoski's Online Genus Database – Cephalopodes
Museum of Comparative Zoology – Harvard University
V. Turek – 2007 Systematic position and variability of the Devonian nautiloids Hercoceras and Ptenoceras

Prehistoric nautiloid genera